Major-General Honourable Sir Francis Richard Bingham,  (5 July 1863 – 5 November 1935) was a British Army officer who became Lieutenant Governor of Jersey.

Military career
Bingham was a younger son of Charles Bingham, 4th Earl of Lucan (1830–1914) by his wife Lady Cecilia Catherine Gordon-Lennox (1838–1919), daughter of the 5th Duke of Richmond. He was commissioned into the Royal Artillery as a lieutenant on 28 July 1883, and was appointed Aide-de-camp to the General Officer Commanding 3rd Infantry Brigade at Aldershot in 1889. Promoted to captain on 15 August 1892, he was attached to the Egyptian Army in 1893.

He became Aide-de-camp to the Commander-in-Chief, Madras later that year, and then Adjutant of the Prince of Wales Own Norfolk Artillery in 1899, with the rank of major on 13 February 1900. In 1911 he became Chief Instructor at the School of Gunnery. He served in World War I as deputy director of Artillery at the War Office and than as a Member of Ministry of Munitions Council. After the War he became Chief of the British Section and President of Sub-Commission for Armaments and Material for the Military Inter-Allied Commission of Control in Germany. He became Lieutenant Governor of Jersey in 1924 and retired 1929.

In retirement he became a Justice of the Peace in Buckinghamshire.

Family
In 1896 he married Kathleen Clarke; the couple had one child. Kathleen, Lady Bingham, died on 18 September 1963.

See also 
 Mount Bingham

References

1863 births
1935 deaths
British Army major generals
English justices of the peace
Knights Commander of the Order of the Bath
Knights Commander of the Order of St Michael and St George
Royal Artillery officers
Governors of Jersey
Younger sons of earls
Bingham family (Ireland)